The BMO Vancouver Marathon is an annual race held on the first Sunday of May each year in Vancouver, British Columbia. As the second largest international marathon in Canada, it has a certified running distance of 26 miles and 385 yards long. The marathon saw over 14,000 people participate on May 4, 2014, with over 3700 completing the marathon distance. This marathon is certified by the International Association of Athletics Federations & Association of International Marathons and Distance Races as a qualifying marathon race.

The race started in 1972, when a small group of 46 runners ran five loops of Stanley Park to complete the first Vancouver International Marathon (known as Lions Gate Road Runners International Marathon). The marathon grew over the next few years to 300 participants in 1977. However the event suffered a major setback in 1976 when a participant, Dr. Leslie Truelove, collapsed mid-race and died due to aneurysm. The Dr. Leslie Truelove Memorial Trophy was established to honour the first male finisher in the 50+ age category. His widow, Rosamund Dashwood, subsequently took up running and became a national champion for her age group.

The 1983 race became known as the "Long Marathon" after runners were misdirected during its running — adding an extra 561 yards to the race.

Currently, several different options are available for participants:
 Full Marathon (a Boston Marathon qualifying event) – 42 km
 Half Marathon – 21 km
 8K – 8 km

Its current title sponsor is the BMO Bank of Montreal thus the marathon is known as BMO Vancouver Marathon. Previous title sponsor was Adidas in 2001–2005, known as the Adidas Vancouver International Marathon.

Organization
The event is hosted by the Vancouver International Marathon Society (VIMS), a non-profit organization run by a volunteer Board of Directors, and managed by staff of the Society.

Each year, VIMS recruit volunteers to help with pre-race preparations and race day operation. In total, about 4000 volunteers help to run the marathon smoothly. Volunteers help in areas such as water stations, medical stations, set-up/take down, food services, given out shirts & medals to runners.

Event details
A free Friendship Run organized by the Running Room is held during the race week for those who wish to participate.

Expo
The Marathon is kicked off by an Expo where runners to pick up their information packages and to receive promotional materials from various sponsors and athletic associations.

Race Day
All participants start off using a staggered time system to ensure timing accuracy. Along the race course, various safety officials are on course, including paramedics and amateur radio operators from VECTOR (Vancouver Emergency Community Telecommunications Organization).

The award ceremony are held on race day. Cash prizes will be presented to the top three male and female full and half marathon runners while merchandise will be awarded to the fastest relay team.

Past winners – Full marathon

 Note: Bold face text denotes current course record holder.

Current World Records established at the Vancouver Marathon

MARATHON

 May 1, 2005 BJ (BETTY JEAN) McHUGH of North Vancouver, BC Canada established a world W77 single age Marathon record with a time of 4:11:28
 May 3, 2009 GWEN McFARLAN of Richmond, BC, Canada established a World W75 age group Marathon record for and a W75 single age world record with a time of 3:57:30

HALF MARATHON

 May 4, 1997 BJ (BETTY JEAN) McHUGH of North Vancouver, BC Canada established a world W69 single age Half Marathon record with a time of 1:41:39
 May 4, 2008 BJ (BETTY JEAN) McHUGH of North Vancouver, Canada (Single age record for Women aged 80 years old, 2:04:19 Half Marathon)
 May 2, 2010 GWEN McFARLAN of Richmond, BC, Canada established a World W76 single age Half Marathon record a world record with a time of 1:52:23
 May 2, 2010 BJ (BETTY JEAN) McHUGH of North Vancouver, BC Canada established a W82 world single age Half Marathon record with a time of 2:23:08

Race Dates
The race is held on the first Sunday of May each year.

May 2, 2010 (39th)
May 1, 2011 (40th)
May 6, 2012 (41st)
May 5, 2013 (42nd)
May 4, 2014 (43rd)
May 3, 2015 (44th)
May 8, 2016 (45th)
May 7, 2017 (46th)
May 6, 2018 (47th)
May 5, 2019 (48th)
Due to the COVID-19 coronavirus pandemic, the 2020 race was cancelled, while the 2021 event was virtualized.

Controversy
After the 2015 Vancouver Marathon, a video surfaced regarding the lack of coordination with traffic police. Runners were stopped mid-race at intersections. The Marathon director addressed the video and as of 2016, the race no longer begins in waves. Now all runners begin once the gun goes off.

Cancellations

The 2020 edition of the marathon was replaced with a virtual event due to the COVID-19 pandemic. The 2021 edition was also cancelled and replaced with virtual events.

See also
 List of marathon races in North America

References

External links
 BMO Vancouver Marathon
 Race Headquarters – Official results listing
 Marathon Guide – Vancouver Marathon
 Lions Gate Road Runners

Marathons in Canada
Sport in Vancouver
Bank of Montreal
Tourist attractions in Vancouver
Recurring sporting events established in 1972
Spring (season) events in Canada